Domunculifex is a genus of land snails in the family Geomitridae.

Species
 Domunculifex littorinella (Mabille, 1883)

References

External links
 Brozzo, A.; Harl, J.; De Mattia, W.; Teixeira, D.; Walther, F.; Groh, K.; Páll‐Gergely, B.; Glaubrecht, M.; Hausdorf, B.; Neiber, M. T. (2020). Molecular phylogeny and trait evolution of Madeiran land snails: radiation of the Geomitrini (Stylommatophora: Helicoidea: Geomitridae). Cladistics. 36(6): 594-616

Geomitridae